

Arthropoda

newly named insects

Archosauromorpha

Newly named dinosaurs
Data are courtesy of George Olshevky's dinosaur genera list.

Synapsids

Non-mammalian

References

1950s in paleontology
Paleontology
Paleontology 7